Ptychadena ingeri is a species of frog in the family Ptychadenidae. It is endemic to the north-eastern Democratic Republic of the Congo where it is known from the Garamba National Park. It is likely to occur more widely, possibly reaching into South Sudan. It is named after Robert F. Inger, an American zoologist from the Field Museum of Natural History. Common name Inger's grassland frog has been coined for it.

Description
Adult males, based on two specimens only, measure  and adult females  in snout–vent length. It is the only member of  the Ptychadena stenocephala group to have a mid-dorsal skin fold. The legs are relatively long. The shared characteristics of this group are reduced toe webbing, sacral folds on the back, and metatarsal tubercles on the feet. Specifically, one and a half phalanges of the toe V are free of webbing in Ptychadena ingeri.

Habitat and conservation
Ptychadena ingeri occurs in open and wooded humid savanna in association with marshes and temporary as well as permanent waterbodies, including streams. It presumably breeds in water. Population trends of Ptychadena ingeri are unknown, but it occurs in an area of low human impact and is unlikely to face significant threats. It appeared to be common at the time of collection in 1959. The International Union for Conservation of Nature (IUCN) has assessed it as "data deficient". The type locality is a protected area.

References

ingeri
Frogs of Africa
Amphibians of the Democratic Republic of the Congo
Endemic fauna of the Democratic Republic of the Congo
Amphibians described in 1991
Taxonomy articles created by Polbot
Northern Congolian forest–savanna mosaic